The 2015 Guzzini Challenger was a professional tennis tournament played on hard courts. It was the thirteenth edition of the tournament which was part of the 2015 ATP Challenger Tour. It took place in Recanati, Italy between 20 and 26 July 2015.

Singles main-draw entrants

Seeds

 1 Rankings are as of July 13, 2015.

Other entrants
The following players received wildcards into the singles main draw:
  Matteo Berrettini
  Edoardo Eremin
  Giacomo Miccini
  Stefano Napolitano

The following player received entry into the singles main draw as a special exempt:
  Salvatore Caruso

The following player received entry the singles main draw as an alternate:
  Quentin Halys

The following players received entry from the qualifying draw:
  Sébastien Boltz
  Ilija Bozoljac
  Flavio Cipolla
  Jesse Witten

The following player received entry as a lucky loser:
  Wang Chuhan

Singles

  Mirza Bašić def.  Ričardas Berankis 6–4, 3–6, 7–6(7–4)

Doubles

  Divij Sharan /  Ken Skupski def.  Ilija Bozoljac /  Flavio Cipolla 4–6, 7–6(7–3), [10–6]

External links
Official Website

Guzzini Challenger
Guzzini Challenger
2015 in Italian tennis